Jan-Martin Bröer (born 19 May 1982 in Minden) is a German rower.

References 
 
 

1982 births
Living people
People from Minden
Sportspeople from Detmold (region)
Rowers at the 2004 Summer Olympics
Olympic rowers of Germany
World Rowing Championships medalists for Germany
German male rowers